Joonas Tamm (born 2 February 1992) is an Estonian professional footballer who plays as a centre-back for Liga I club FCSB and the Estonia national team. Tamm has won the Estonian Footballer of the Year in 2022.

Club career

Tulevik
Tamm started out playing for hometown team Tulevik. He made his debut in the Meistriliiga on 29 March 2008, in a 1–1 home draw against Sillamäe Kalev.

Flora
In February 2009, Tamm moved to Flora. He scored his first Meistriliiga goal on 9 May 2009, in a 4–0 away victory over Tammeka.

In August 2009, Tamm joined Italian club Sampdoria on a season-long loan, where he played for the club's Primavera side.

Tamm returned to Flora in August 2010. He helped the team win the Meistriliiga in 2010.

IFK Norrköping
On 27 December 2010, Tamm signed a three-year contract with Allsvenskan club IFK Norrköping, with the option to extend the contract for another year. In July 2011, he moved to Division 1 side IF Sylvia on loan. Tamm scored on his debut for the club on 9 July 2011, in a 2–1 away victory over Motala AIF. He made his debut in the Allsvenskan on 25 August 2011, in a 2–1 home victory over Djurgårdens IF.

Trelleborgs FF
On 2 December 2013, Tamm signed a one-year contract with Division 1 club Trelleborgs FF.

Return to Tulevik
On 9 February 2015, Tamm returned to his boyhood club, Tulevik, on a one-year contract. Positioned as a centre-forward, he went on to score 9 goals in 15 league appearances. On 2 May 2015, in the season 2015 he scored a Hat-tricks against Paide Linnameeskond.

Return to Flora
On 22 June 2015, Tamm joined his former club Flora for an undisclosed fee. He went on to help Flora win Meistriliiga titles in the 2015 and 2017 seasons.

Sarpsborg 08 (loan)
On 31 January 2018, Tamm joined Eliteserien club Sarpsborg 08 on a season-long loan. Starting from the first qualifying round, he helped the team reach the UEFA Europa League group stage. Tamm played in all six group stage matches as Sarpsborg 08 finished last in their group.

Korona Kielce (loan)
On 8 February 2019 Tamm joined Ekstraklasa club Korona Kielce on a six-month loan deal.

Lillestrøm (loan)
On 27 June 2019, Tamm moved to Eliteserien club Lillestrøm on loan until the end of the 2018–19 season, with the option to make the deal permanent.

FC Desna Chernihiv 
In January 2020 he signed with FC Desna Chernihiv of the Ukrainian Premier League. Tamm helped his new club to a 4th place finish in the 2019–20 Ukrainian Premier League and qualifying for the play-offs. On 16 July he scored against FC Oleksandriya during the play-offs.

On 22 August he scored in a 3–1 victory over Zorya Luhansk in the opening match of the 2020–21 Ukrainian Premier League season.

On 24 September he was included in the squad for the Europa League third qualifying round tie against VfL Wolfsburg at AOK Stadion.

Vorskla Poltava
On 28 May 2021 he signed for Vorskla Poltava and on 22 June started his preparation with the new club. With the club he played in the 2020–21 Europa League second qualifying round. On 21 November he scored his first goal of the 2021–22 season against FC Mariupol.

Second return to Flora
In March 2022, Tamm returned to Flora once again on loan until the end of the season due to the interruption of the Russian invasion of Ukraine. He played the first match on 9 March in the Estonian Cup against FCI Levadia, helping the side advance to the semi-final. On 12 April, he scored again against Kuressaare at the Kuressaare linnastaadion in Meistriliiga. He helped the club to win the Meistriliiga in 2022.

FCSB
On 10 July 2022 he signed for Romanian Liga I club FCSB. On 24 July 2022, he made his debut in Liga I against Rapid București at the Stadionul Rapid-Giulești in Giulești. He scored his first goal for the club in a league match against Craiova on 31 July. He was later chosen for the league's Team of the Week. On 3 August he scored his first goal in the UEFA Europa Conference League against DAC Dunajská Streda at the MOL Aréna in Dunajská Streda providing the 1–0 away victory for his team. On 14 August he scored the winning goal in a league game against Targoviste Chindia and again was named to the Team of the Week.

International career
Tamm has represented Estonia at all levels, from the under-16 side to senior squad. He represented Estonia's under-17 team at the 2008 Under-17 Baltic Cup, eventually reaching the final. On 10 June 2011, he was named by manager Tarmo Rüütli to the Estonian senior squad to face Chile and Uruguay in friendly matches. He made his senior debut for the on 19 June in a 4–0 away defeat to Chile. Tamm scored his first international goals on 7 October 2017, when he scored a second-half hat trick in a 6–0 away victory over Gibraltar in 2018 FIFA World Cup qualification. In doing so, he became the first player to score a hat-trick for Estonia since 1996. He won the 2020 Baltic Cup with Estonia, playing in the final against Lithuania. On 2 June 2022 he scored against San Marino in UEFA Nations League D play in Tallinn.

Career statistics

Club

International

International goals
As of 2 June 2022. Estonia score listed first, score column indicates score after each Tamm goal.

Honours

Club
Flora
Meistriliiga: (4) 2010, 2015, 2017, 2022
Estonian Cup: 2015–16
Estonian Supercup: (2) 2009, 2016

International
Estonia
Baltic Cup: 2020
Baltic Cup runner-up: 2018

Estonia U19
Under-19 Baltic Cup runner-Up: 2009, 2010, 2011

Estonia U17
Under-17 Baltic Cup runner-Up: 2008

Individual
Estonian Footballer of the Year: 2022

Gallery

References

External links

1992 births
Living people
Sportspeople from Viljandi
Estonian footballers
Association football defenders
Association football forwards
Meistriliiga players
Viljandi JK Tulevik players
FC Flora players
Esiliiga players
Ettan Fotboll players
IF Sylvia players
Trelleborgs FF players
Allsvenskan players
IFK Norrköping players
Eliteserien players
Sarpsborg 08 FF players
Lillestrøm SK players
Ekstraklasa players
Korona Kielce players
FC Desna Chernihiv players
FC Vorskla Poltava players
Ukrainian Premier League players
Liga I players
Estonia youth international footballers
Estonia under-21 international footballers
Estonia international footballers
Estonian expatriate footballers
Expatriate footballers in Italy
Expatriate footballers in Sweden
Expatriate footballers in Norway
Expatriate footballers in Poland
Expatriate footballers in Ukraine
Estonian expatriate sportspeople in Italy
Estonian expatriate sportspeople in Sweden
Estonian expatriate sportspeople in Norway
Estonian expatriate sportspeople in Poland
Estonian expatriate sportspeople in Ukraine
Estonian expatriate sportspeople in Romania
Expatriate footballers in Romania
FC Steaua București players